Rodrigue N'Doram (born 25 November 1987) is a Chadian international footballer who currently plays for Foullah Edifice FC. He made his debut for Chad on 6 June 2015 in the 2–1 win against Guinea. He has spent the majority of his playing career in France, representing Carquefou and Cholet amongst others.

He is the son of former Chad international footballer Japhet N'Doram.

References

1987 births
Living people
People from N'Djamena
Chadian footballers
Chad international footballers
USJA Carquefou players
SO Cholet players

Association football midfielders